TS O’Rourke (born 1968) is an Irish author.

His novels include:
Ganglands (Breffni Books, 1996; Breffni eBooks 2010).)
Death Call (A Carroll & Grant Mystery) (Breffni Books, 1997; Breffni eBooks 2010).
The Republican – An Irish Civil War Story (Killynon House Books, 2006; Breffni eBooks, 2010).
Damned Nation (A Carroll & Grant Mystery) (Breffni eBooks, 2010).
The Carroll & Grant Collection (Breffni eBooks, 2010).
Killing a Friend (Breffni eBooks, 2010).
The Libertine – a picaresque novel (Breffni eBooks, 2011).
His short fiction includes:
Why I Kill (The Confession of a Serial Killer) (Breffni eBooks, 2010).
Candy Says Kill: A Shot of Modern Noir (Breffni eBooks, 2011).
Sunset Strip: A Shot of Modern Noir (Breffni eBooks 2011).
Off The Edge: an anthology of Irish writing (Killynon House Books, 2006).

References 

1968 births
Irish writers
Living people